Guns 'N' Wankers is a punk rock band, formed by ex-members of English punk band Snuff, and English rock band The Wildhearts in the early 1990s. The band consisted of Duncan Redmonds (vocals, guitar), Pat Walters (drums, vocals) and Joolz Dean (bass guitar, vocals). The three formed the band on the same day Snuff played their farewell gig (now reformed) at the Kilburn National, and Walters was relieved of duty with The Wildhearts. On the off chance, Duncan gave Walters a call, having seen him play in a band called The Milk Monitors a few years before. Walters called his friend Joolz Dean (Pat and Joolz had played in an early incarnation of The Wildhearts and before that in London glam punk act Soho Roses) and the line-up was complete.

After touring the United Kingdom with Leatherface, NOFX and Wat Tyler, the band set about recording demos.  This coincided with a tour of the Basque region in Spain, where copies of the demos sold well. On their return Sean of Wat Tyler, the man behind Rugger Bugger Records, put up the modest money to record a Guns 'N' Wankers album, which was recorded and produced by Andy J. Davies in Hitchin, Herts. The recordings were originally released on Rugger Bugger Records as three 7-inch EPs: Hardcore, Pop, and Metal (A Silly EP was free with an issue of Fear & Loathing 'zine in very limited numbers), the album was later that year, omitting the track "Evergreen" from the Metal EP. However, when NOFX's Fat Mike showed an interest in releasing the album on US punk label Fat Wreck Chords, he dispensed with all the material from Metal. The remainder was a compilation of the Hardcore and Pop EPs, released as an eight-track album called For Dancing And Listening on Fat Wreck Chords. The band split due to the reformation of Snuff. Pat Walters went on to play with singer-songwriter Marc Carroll in a band called The Hormones and Joolz formed punk band Dogpiss.

The song "Skin Deep" was released on the 1994 Fat Wreck Chords compilation album, Fat Music for Fat People.

Reformed 2019 
Guns 'n' Wankers have reformed as a 3 piece with original members Duncan Redmonds & Pat Walters, joined by Wes Wasley (Consumed) on bass.

Discography

References

English punk rock groups
Fat Wreck Chords artists
Musical groups established in 1991
Musical groups disestablished in 1994
1991 establishments in the United Kingdom